Andrew Jenkins (born 11 March 1971) is an English professional darts player who competes in Professional Darts Corporation (PDC) events. He was nicknamed "Rocky" due to his rough personality. Jenkins has reached high rankings in the PDC, but has never won a major tournament. In 2009, Jenkins was given a PDC ban for almost two years for an assault on Terry Jenkins during a non-televised PDC tournament.

Career

BDO
Jenkins began his career playing in British Darts Organisation competitions and had some success in the open events. He took the Embassy British Gold Cup Singles in 1994, England Open in 2000, Swiss Open and Japan Open in 2001 and the Isle of Man Open in 2002.

His record at the BDO World Darts Championship was disappointing. He made his debut at the Lakeside Country Club in 1995, and managed only one win in his seven consecutive appearances. His only victory came in 1996 against Belgian Bruno Raes, and suffered defeats to Sean Palfrey (1995), Andy Fordham (1996, 1998), Ronnie Baxter (1997), Graham Hunt (1999), Colin Monk (2000) and Kevin Painter (2001).

Despite his poor record at Lakeside, Jenkins made it to the semi-finals of the revived News of the World Darts Championship in 1997, and the quarter-finals of the Winmau World Masters in 1999 and 2000.

PDC
He decided to switch to the Professional Darts Corporation in 2002 where his first round jinx continued - he lost to number nine seed Denis Ovens at the 2002 PDC World Championship. He rose steadily up the world rankings after joining the PDC and was seeded 10th for the 2003 World Championship. Again he went out in the first round to Chris Mason.

When the World Championship field expanded in 2004, the top players joined in at the third round stage - where Jenkins again lost his first match (to Bob Anderson). At the 2005 World Championship, Jenkins finally notched up a victory over Peter Evison, who had played dreadfully, averaging just 67.34 for the match. Jenkins went out to Painter in the last 16. A second round defeat came in the 2006 World Championship - Jenkins was seeded eight (his highest ever ranking) who defeat Patrick Bulen and but went down to Wayne Jones.

He went into the 2007 World Championship as the number 12 seed. He finally managed a decent run to justify his consistent high ranking, putting out highly fancied Adrian Lewis in the last 16 on his way to the semi-final. Raymond van Barneveld was too strong for him and won 6-0. In the 2008 World Championship, Jenkins got through a tough first-round game against Czech qualifier Miloslav Navratil but was then beaten 4-0 by Alan Tabern in the second round.

Jenkins has had more success away from the World Championships. He reached the semi-finals of the World Grand Prix in 2002 and the semi-finals of the UK Open in 2004 - losing to John Part on both occasions.

Jenkins received a suspension from the tour following misconduct at the PDC's German Open event. He returned to the circuit on 15 May, with another nine months suspended in case of future misdemeanours. His suspension however cost him a place in the 2008 World Matchplay as he didn't win enough money to qualify.

He beat Phil Taylor at the 2008 Grand Slam of Darts but went out in the last 16 to Simon Whitlock.

Jenkins suffered a first round exit in the 2009 PDC World Championship, losing to Co Stompé. His inability to defend semi-final prize money from the 2007 Championship, meant that Jenkins dropped out of the top 32 on the PDC Order of Merit.

In November 2009, the Darts Regulation Authority gave Jenkins a 24-month ban (20 months suspended) for an assault on Terry Jenkins that took place at the Nuland Players Championship in the Netherlands in October.

He lost in the first round of the 2010 World Championship to Peter Manley. He was due to participate in the 2010 Players Championship Finals, but due to his ban, his place in the draw was taken by Manley. After four months out, Jenkins returned the PDC circuit, but failed to qualify for any major events that year. His failure to qualify for the 2011 World Championship was his first absence from either World Championship since 1994. Jenkins qualified for the 2013 World Championship via the Pro Tour Order of Merit and lost to Justin Pipe 3–0 in sets in the first round, winning only two legs during the match. He lost 9–3 to Stephen Bunting in the third round of the UK Open. In November, Jenkins reached his first ranking final for five years at the 14th Players Championship of the year. Whilst the top 16 in the Order of Merit were competing in the Masters, Jenkins was winning six games before losing 6–3 to Ian White in the final. Jenkins came agonisingly close to reaching the 2014 World Championship as he finished just £200 behind the final qualifier on the ProTour Order of Merit.
He therefore played in the qualifier and won four games to advance to the semi-finals where a fifth win would guarantee him at least a place in the preliminary round, but he was beaten 5–3 by Matt Clark.

Jenkins could not qualify for the 2014 UK Open as he failed to progress past the last 128 in any of the six qualifiers. His best result of the year was in the reaching the last 16 of the 13th Players Championship where he lost 6–5 to Mervyn King.

Jenkins' ranking of world number 69 at the beginning of 2015 meant he needed to enter Q School as he was outside the top 64 who remain on tour and he qualified for a two-year tour card on the second day by beating Chris Dobey 5–3. He was eliminated of the UK Open 9–6 by Josh Payne in the third round. Successive wins over Dave Chisnall and Ronnie Baxter saw Jenkins play in his only quarter-final this year at the 12th Players Championship where he lost 6–2 to Peter Wright.

Jenkins had 6–5 and 9–5 wins over Wayne Jones and Richie Corner at the 2016 UK Open, before losing 9–2 to Vincent van der Voort in the fourth round. He had his best run of the year at the eighth Players Championship by knocking out Kevin Painter, Steve Brown, Michael Smith and Justin Pipe to play in the quarter-finals, where he was whitewashed 6–0 by Jamie Caven. Jenkins beat Steve West 6–3 and watched Alan Norris miss match darts to win 6–5 at the European Darts Trophy. He lost 6–3 to James Wade in the third round. As well as his quarter-final, a last 16 finish and a number of last 32 finishes saw Jenkins earn a place in the Players Championship Finals, where he lost 6–3 to Justin Pipe in the first round.

Jenkins qualified for the 2019 UK Open on 9 February 2019 following success at the Riley's qualifier in South Benfleet.

World Championship results

BDO
1995: First round (lost to Sean Palfrey 1–3)
1996: Second round (lost to Andy Fordham 2–3)
1997: First round (lost to Ronnie Baxter 0–3)
1998: First round (lost to Andy Fordham 1–3)
1999: First round (lost to Graham Hunt 1–3) 
2000: First round (lost to Colin Monk 2–3)
2001: First round (lost to Kevin Painter 0–3)

PDC
2002: First round (lost to Denis Ovens 3–4)
2003: Second round (lost to Chris Mason 2–4)
2004: Third round (lost to Bob Anderson 1–4)
2005: Fourth round (lost to Kevin Painter 3–4)
2006: Second round (lost to Wayne Jones 3–4)
2007: Semi-finals (lost to Raymond van Barneveld 0–6)
2008: Second round (lost to Alan Tabern 0–4)
2009: First round (lost to Co Stompé 1–3)
2010: First round (lost to Peter Manley 2–3)
2013: First round (lost to Justin Pipe 0–3)

WSDT
 2023: Second round (lost to Richie Howson 1–3)

Career statistics

(W) Won; (F) finalist; (SF) semifinalist; (QF) quarterfinalist; (#R) rounds 6, 5, 4, 3, 2, 1; (RR) round-robin stage; (Prel.) Preliminary round; (DNQ) Did not qualify; (DNP) Did not participate; (NH) Not held

Performance timeline

References

External links
Management website

Living people
English darts players
1971 births
British Darts Organisation players
Sportspeople from Portsmouth
Professional Darts Corporation former tour card holders
PDC ranking title winners